The 1983–84 NBA season was the Clippers' 14th season in the NBA and their sixth and final season in San Diego as the team moved to the city of Los Angeles.

Draft picks

Roster
{| class="toccolours" style="font-size: 95%; width: 100%;"
|-
! colspan="2" style="background-color: #E23B45;  color: #FFFFFF; text-align: center;" | San Diego Clippers 1983-1984 roster
|- style="background-color: #106BB4; color: #FFFFFF;   text-align: center;"
! Players !! Coaches
|-
| valign="top" |
{| class="sortable" style="background:transparent; margin:0px; width:100%;"
! Pos. !! # !! Nat. !! Name !! Ht. !! Wt. !! From
|-

Regular season

Season standings

Notes
 z, y – division champions
 x – clinched playoff spot

Record vs. opponents

Game log

Player statistics

Awards and records

Transactions
The Clippers were involved in the following transactions during the 1983–84 season.

Trades

Free agents

Additions

Subtractions

References

Los Angeles Clippers seasons
San